"You're the Only World I Know" is a song  written by Sonny James and Robert Tubert and performed by Sonny James.

Song popularity
In January 1965, "You're the Only World I Know was Sonny James' second No. 1 on the Billboard magazine Hot Country Singles chart (after "Young Love" in early 1957).  The song had crossover popularity, reaching the Billboard Top 100 and Easy listening surveys.
"You're the Only World I Know" also kicked off James' amazing run of popularity, which continued to the mid-'70s. From 1965 through 1974, James enjoyed 22 No. 1 songs, including a string of 16 straight.

Chart performance

Cover Versions
In 1973, a cover of "You're the Only World I Know" appeared on Marie Osmond's debut album Paper Roses. (MGM SE 4910, side 1, track 4)

References

1964 singles
Sonny James songs
Capitol Records singles
1964 songs
Songs written by Sonny James